Ahmadkhan or Ahmad Khan may refer to:

Ahmadkhan, Lorestan, a village in Iran
Ahmad Akbar Khan (born 1984), Australian born Pakistani footballer
Sultan Ahmad Khan, 19th-century sultan of the Principality of Herat in Afghanistan

See also
 Ahmed Khan (disambiguation)